Coquitlam Now was a bi-weekly community newspaper, based in Coquitlam, and served the Tri-Cities region of British Columbia's Lower Mainland from 1984 to 2016. The Coquitlam Now is no longer in circulation.

The paper was part of the Van-Net chain owned by Glacier Media Group.

See also
List of newspapers in Canada

References

External links
Official website

Companies based in Coquitlam
Defunct newspapers published in British Columbia
Glacier Media
Publications established in 1984
1984 establishments in British Columbia
Biweekly newspapers published in Canada